Cornelio or Cornélio may refer to:

Cornelio Bentivoglio (1668–1732), Italian nobleman and cardinal
Cornelio Da Montalcino, Franciscan friar who embraced Judaism, burned alive in 1554
Cornelio Fabro (1911–1995), Italian Catholic priest and philosopher
Cornelio Musso (born 1511), Italian Friar Minor Conventual, and Bishop of Bitonto
Cornélio Pires (1884–1958), journalist, writer, and Brazilian folklorist
Cornelio Reyna (1940–1997), Mexican norteño singer
Cornelio Saavedra (1761–1829), military man, born to a noble family in present-day Bolivia
Cornelio Saavedra Province, province in the North-eastern parts of the Bolivian department of Potosí
Cornelio Saavedra Rodríguez (1823–1891), Chilean politician and military figure
Cornelio Sommaruga (born 1932), prominent Swiss humanitarian, lawyer and diplomat, President of the ICRC 1987–1999
Cornelio Velásquez (born 1968), jockey in American Thoroughbred horse racing
Cornelio Villareal (1904–1992), Filipino politician
Enrique Cornelio Osornio Martínez de los Ríos (1868–1945), Mexican politician and military surgeon
Estadio Cornelio Santos, football stadium in Campamento, Honduras
Maria Valentina Plaza Cornelio, Governor of the Philippine province of Agusan del Sur
Roman Catholic Diocese of Cornélio Procópio, diocese located in the city of Cornélio Procópio in Londrina, Brazil

Italian masculine given names
Spanish masculine given names